Gaius Makouta (born 25 July 1997) is a professional footballer who plays as a midfielder for Portuguese club Boavista. Born in France, he represents the Congo national team.

Club career
In February 2019 he joined Braga. 

In January 2020 Makouta was loaned to Beroe.

On 27 June 2021, he signed a three-year contract with Boavista.

International career
Born in France and of Republic of the Congo descent, Makouta was called up to the Congo in October 2019.

Personal life
He is the grandson of Jean-Pierre Makouta-Mboukou, a Congolese politician and a famous writer and researcher in linguistics.

Career statistics

Club

International goals
Scores and results list Congo's goal tally first, score column indicates score after each Makouta goal.

References

1997 births
Living people
Footballers from Val-de-Marne
Republic of the Congo footballers
Republic of the Congo international footballers
French footballers
French sportspeople of Republic of the Congo descent
Association football midfielders
Le Havre AC players
Longford Town F.C. players
Aris Thessaloniki F.C. players
S.C. Covilhã players
S.C. Braga B players
PFC Beroe Stara Zagora players
Boavista F.C. players
Championnat National 3 players
Football League (Greece) players
First Professional Football League (Bulgaria) players
Primeira Liga players
Republic of the Congo expatriate footballers
French expatriate footballers
Republic of the Congo expatriate sportspeople in Ireland
French expatriate sportspeople in Ireland
Expatriate association footballers in Ireland
Republic of the Congo expatriate sportspeople in Greece
French expatriate sportspeople in Greece
Expatriate footballers in Greece
Republic of the Congo expatriate sportspeople in Portugal
French expatriate sportspeople in Portugal
Expatriate footballers in Portugal
Republic of the Congo expatriate sportspeople in Bulgaria
French expatriate sportspeople in Bulgaria
Expatriate footballers in Bulgaria
Black French sportspeople